Eugene F. Hollander or Gino Hollander (1924 – August 27, 2015) was an American painter. He began painting in New York City during the abstract expressionist movement.

Biography

Early life
Hollander's father was in the fur business, enabling the family to travel to Europe including a nine-month stay in Paris. At age 13, he experienced his first adventure with a 1,000-mile bike trip up the Connecticut River Valley alone. He was a member of the United States Army's 10th Mountain Division Ski Troops and is a veteran of World War II.

New York City
In the mid-20th century, he was a successful filmmaker along with his wife Barbara Hollander before he started painting in 1960, during the abstract expressionism movement in New York City. He became one of the group that defined this movement and whom all hung out at the famous Cedar Tavern. Acrylic paint was just emerging at that time and Hollander was among the first to explore its possibilities. From 1960-1962, he had his studio and the first Hollander Gallery on Bleecker Street, in Greenwich Village. During that time his paintings sold to the likes of Jacqueline Kennedy, Steve McQueen, Norman Rockwell, and Ralph Lauren.

Spain
Despite having experienced initial success in New York, Hollander moved his family to Spain in 1962, to find his voice in painting.  He often bartered paintings to support his family while he continued developing his style. Hollander and his wife Barbara took their children on archaeological trips, following the road construction crews which were building new highways throughout Spain, unearthing ancient treasures. They created Museo Hollander, renamed Pizarra Municipal Museum , located in an old Cortijo. The museum was to exhibit this collection of Spanish artifacts that span along with Hollander's own paintings. In 1990, the Hollanders donated their museum to the government of Spain and were nationally awarded in honor of the King's birthdate a Medallion de Plata for contributing to the country's growth in tourism.

Aspen
After nearly 20 somewhat reclusive years in Aspen, Colorado during which he appeared in the film "Mountain Town", Hollander gave in to his lungs' demands in the near 8,000-foot altitude and moved with his wife Barbara to Ojai, California.

California
Hollander died, surrounded by his family, at the age of 91 in Newport Beach, California.

Artistic Style 
Hollander's work is reflective of his ethos; he makes art because he must, and while he is aware of the art world, it's only vaguely so. His work is honest and emotional; he paints for himself. He has no wish to engage in a dialogue with the viewer. It is for him to paint, for the viewer to view. He refuses to title his paintings. He tells no stories. To him, “there is nothing verbal about a canvas. A painting is simply one way to express a feeling and feelings can only be made less if they are talked to death."

His portraits are purposely poised on the far edge of nothingness, faces left blank or at best enigmatic. His figures are abstracted and his abstracts disturbingly figurative. He'll paint through the day and on into the night, each canvas a different mood. From stark black and white to a splash of brilliant colors and on to a subtle moody sepia, then back to a black and white, gentle this time. He is a complex man and his canvasses reinforce this complexity in the very simplicity of their form and content.

"I chose painting for the immediacy of the moment the medium can allow—its immediacy of expression. I find my deepest moments are of feeling and that is what I strive for in my painting. The art of painting provides me with a constant mirror of my being—both successes and failures, the good moments and bad.  I prefer to paint it all as it comes.  Painting takes on a rhythm like breathing: loose, tight, whatever.  Living and painting become one. I believe in the universality of art’s function, a heritage of involvement of everyone – the  youngest to the oldest, the artist, the viewer. A subliminal communication of feelings about the human condition. My paintings are expressly directed to evoke an emotional reaction from the viewer."   - Gino Hollander, 2010.

Hollander Galleries
HG Sullivan St., Greenwich Village, NYC 1961 - 1st painting sold here.

HG, Bleecker St., Greenwich Village, NYC 1962-1967 - paintings sold here provided money for the move to Spain.

HG, 950 Madison Ave., NYC 1967-1972 - across from the Whitney Museum.

HG Torremolinos, Costa del Sol, Spain 1962-1963

HG Atalaya Park, Costa del Sol, Spain 1964-1985

HG Hotel Puente Romano, Marbella, Spain 1965-1985

HG Mount St., London 1966-1976

HG Marbella Club Hotel, Spain 1967-1990

HG Hollander-York, Toronto 1968-1980

HG West Broadway, NYC 1970-1982

HG Hamburg, Germany 1975-1978

HG Museo Hollander, Cortijo De Las Yeguas, Spain 1982-1990 – archeological museum as well as a charitable organization.

HG, Santa Fe, NM 2013–present. Currently located at 225 Delgado Street, Santa Fe, NM 87501

Notes

Gino Hollander Website

Public Institutions
Museo Bellas Artes
Bristol Museum
Aspen Art Museum
Herbert F. Johnson Museum, Cornell University
Sloane Kettering Hospital
Ojai Valley Hospital
New York University Art Collection, now Grey Art Gallery
Shell Oil Co., Houston
City College of New York
New York Presbyterian Hospital
Mount Sinai Hospital, New York
Love Field, Dallas
Pennsylvania Hospital
Aspen Valley Hospital
White Museum
Museo Hollander
National Jewish Medical Center
Churchill College, Cambridge University
La Galería de La Esquina A.C, Tijuana Baja California Mex.

Private and Estate Collections
Artur Rubenstein
James Michener
Ralph Lauren
John and Julie King
Luciano Pavarotti
Jeffrey N. Mahony
John Crosby
Morley Safer
Jacqueline Kennedy
Vizcondesa de Llanterno
Alan Ladd
Leontyne Price
Herbert Kretzmer
Ricky Nelson
Oscar de la Renta
Howard Head
Taki Fukishima
Van Cliburn
Ben Thylan]
Vincent Sardi
Faye Emerson	
Burt Lancaster
John Mitchell
Betty Pfister
Isaac Stern	
Princess Maria Louisa de Prussia
Sophia of Spain
Count Schoenburg
Condessa de Salamanca
Geoffrey Beene
John Houston	
William Pattis
Norman Rockwell
Brian Epstein
Edward G. Robinson
Steve McQueen
Norman Mailer
Arjun Gupta
Leif Kreutzberg
Anna & Lawrence Olsen
David & Rhonda Saaks
Donal Ward Collection
Linda Pierson'
Leon Chou
William Brown
 S Edward Bothers
J. Carrasco
Brian D. Fay / Lawrence A. Grab, Jr. 
Stephen Lloyd Webb
Francisco E.Dominguez
Rose & Ralph Lachman

References 

1924 births
2015 deaths
20th-century American painters
American male painters
21st-century American painters
Artists from Newark, New Jersey
People from Greenwich Village
Painters from New York City
American expatriates in France
20th-century American male artists